The 2016–17 Eastern Washington Eagles men's basketball team represented Eastern Washington University during the 2016–17 NCAA Division I men's basketball season. The Eagles were led by sixth-year head coach Jim Hayford and played their home games at Reese Court in Cheney, Washington as members of the Big Sky Conference. They finished the season 22–12, 13–5 in Big Sky play to finish in second place. As the No. 2 seed in the Big Sky tournament, they defeated Sacramento State in the quarterfinals before losing to Weber State in the semifinals. They were invited to the College Basketball Invitational where they lost in the first round to Wyoming.

On March 29, 2017, head coach Jim Hayford left Eastern Washington to take the head coaching job at in-state rival Seattle and was replaced by top assistant Shantay Legans.

Previous season
The Eagles finished the 2015–16 season 18–16, 10–6 in Big Sky play to finish in a tie for fifth place. They defeated Northern Arizona in the first round of the Big Sky tournament before losing to Idaho in the quarterfinals. They received an invitation to the College Basketball Invitational where they defeated Pepperdine to advance to the quarterfinals before losing to Nevada.

Offseason

Departures

Incoming transfers

2016 recruiting class

Roster

Schedule and results

|-
!colspan=9 style=| Exhibition

|-
!colspan=9 style=| Non-conference regular season

|-
!colspan=9 style=| Big Sky regular season

|-
!colspan=9 style=| Big Sky tournament

|-
!colspan=9 style=| CBI

See also
 2016–17 Eastern Washington Eagles women's basketball team

References

Eastern Washington Eagles men's basketball seasons
Eastern Washington
Eastern Washington
Eastern Washington
Eastern Washington